Michael Sydney Trusson (born 26 May 1959) is an English former professional footballer. He made over 400 appearances in a fifteen-year professional career, and later worked in sports marketing and as a scout.

Football career
Born in Northolt London, Trusson had trials with Chelsea as a schoolboy but was not signed by the club.  After relocating to Somerset, he was spotted playing local amateur football by Plymouth Argyle, then of the Football League Second Division, and began his professional career for the club in the 1976–77 season.  In his first season with the club, Argyle were relegated to the Third Division, but he remained with the club until 1980, making over 80 appearances in total. In 1980, he was transferred to another Third Division club, Sheffield United, but again saw his team relegated in his first season, as the "Blades" dropped into the Fourth Division. In the 1981–82 season Trusson missed only two of United's 46 league games and scored 11 goals to help the club gain promotion back to the Third Division at the first attempt. He was also the Sheffield United player of the year in seasons 1981–82 and 1982–83. In December 1983 he joined near-neighbours Rotherham United, where he spent four years and made nearly 150 appearances. In 1987, he moved to yet another Third Division club, Brighton & Hove Albion, and once again helped the team gain promotion. In 1989, he stepped down to the Fourth Division to join Gillingham, and rounded off his league career with three injury-blighted seasons at the Kent-based club before moving to Hong Kong to play for Sing Tao. On his return to England he signed for AFC Bournemouth, where former Gillingham teammate Tony Pulis was manager, but never played a match for the club. He did, however, spend two years serving as the club's youth team coach, and later had a brief spell as first team coach.  After leaving Dean Court, he finished his football career playing non-league football in Sussex firstly as a player for Stamco in the Sussex League and then as player coach as Stamco got promoted through the English football league system to the Southern League.

Post-football career
After retiring as a player, Trusson worked as marketing manager for Football Football, a football-themed restaurant in London. He also worked for the Professional Footballers' Association in a marketing role, and was described as a prominent figure in the marketing of the sport. He also worked as sponsorship manager for the World Snooker Association. In 2000, he was appointed as chief scout for Premier League club Portsmouth.

On 20 November 2020, he was appointed the assistant manager at Sheffield Wednesday to assist new manager Tony Pulis.  His spell would last just over a month, he left the club when Pulis was dismissed on 28 December 2020.

References

1959 births
Living people
People from Ealing
English footballers
Association football midfielders
Plymouth Argyle F.C. players
Sheffield United F.C. players
Rotherham United F.C. players
Brighton & Hove Albion F.C. players
Gillingham F.C. players
Sing Tao SC players
AFC Bournemouth players
St. Leonards F.C. players
Expatriate footballers in Hong Kong
English expatriate sportspeople in Hong Kong
English expatriate footballers